Ferrissia tanganyicensis is a species of small freshwater snail or limpet, an aquatic  gastropod in the family Planorbidae.

Distribution 
This species is only found in Lake Tanganyika in Burundi, the Democratic Republic of the Congo, Tanzania, and Zambia.

See also 
 List of non-marine molluscs of Tanzania

References

Planorbidae
Snails of Lake Tanganyika
Invertebrates of Burundi
Invertebrates of the Democratic Republic of the Congo
Invertebrates of Tanzania
Invertebrates of Zambia
Gastropods described in 1906
Taxonomy articles created by Polbot
Taxobox binomials not recognized by IUCN